Moravia High School is an Appanoose County secondary school located in Moravia, Iowa,  USA, part of the Moravia Community School District. The sports teams are collectively called "The Mohawks".  

A small school district (142 students in grades 7–12), it has been growing in recent years.  It was mentioned as a bronze medal school in U.S. News & World Reports "Best High Schools".

 Athletics 
The Mohawks' compete in the Bluegrass Conference, including the following sports:

Volleyball 
Football (8-man)
Cross Country
Basketball (boys and girls)
Wrestling 
Track and Field (boys and girls)
Golf (boys and girls)
Baseball 
Softball

Notable alumni
Molly Bolin Kazmer (Molly Van Benthuysen), one of the first professional women's basketball stars with the Iowa Cornets of the Women's Professional Basketball League, was a 1975 graduate of Moravia High School.

References

External links
Official Site

Public high schools in Iowa
Iowa High School Athletic Association
Schools in Appanoose County, Iowa